Dwayne Harper (born March 29, 1966) is a former professional American football cornerback who played 12 seasons in the National Football League. He started in Super Bowl XXIX for the San Diego Chargers.

Harper is married to Dr. Michele Reid and together they own a number of businesses in the South Carolina area.

References 

1966 births
Living people
People from Orangeburg, South Carolina
American football cornerbacks
Seattle Seahawks players
San Diego Chargers players
Detroit Lions players
South Carolina State Bulldogs football players
San Francisco Demons players
Players of American football from South Carolina